Meendum Savithri is a 1996 Tamil-language drama film directed by Visu and produced by Nagi Reddi. It stars Revathi, Saranya Ponvannan, Nizhalgal Ravi and Raja, with Ramesh Aravind, Visu, Nagesh, Jai Ganesh, Annapoorna, Seetha and Pandu playing supporting roles. The film, released on 9 February 1996, is based on Visu's novel of the same name that was serialised in Ananda Vikatan, and bombed at the box-office. It was simultaneously made in Telugu as Neti Savithri with Gollapudi Maruti Rao replacing Visu.

Plot 
Manju is an outspoken woman and she works in a small company. She lives with her father Narayana Moorthy who tries to reform the people as much as possible. Belonging to a middle-class family, she cannot provide a dowry for the potential grooms. One day, Manju comes across an innovative advertisement : a groom is looking for a bride without any dowries. The groom is Vasudevan who seems to be the perfect future husband. When Manju and Narayana Moorthy meet his family, Narayana Moorthy is shocked. Vasudevan's father Ramamoorthy became mentally ill when his business failed, his sister Gayathri became mentally ill when someone raped her, his brother Bhaskar is a drunkard and his mother is an asthma patient. Finally, Manju and Vasudevan get married. During the first night, Vasudevan beats her and falls down unconscious.

Vasudevan's family was, in fact, acting, they are perfectly all right but they are scared of something. The truth is that Vasudevan was already married to Uma. Uma was initially in love with Narasimman, a do-gooder however she later rejects him after discovering that he is a con man, she marries Vasudevan. Narasimman in order to extract money from her creates photographs showing him and Uma being married which leads to Vasudevan assume that Uma had cheated him. Vasudevan gets affected psychologically due to her absence in order to make him normal his whole family pretends to be suffering from problems.

Manju then plans to expose Narasimman's cruel ways. She and Vasudevan's family disguise themselves as a rich family from Mumbai with Bhaskar disguising himself as broker Ananthakrishnan. Narayana Moorthy who learns of the plan also joins the act as her rich father. Narayana Moorthy though not happy with the developments has to go along with the act after Manju threatens to commit suicide. During the engagement between Manju and Narasimman, Narasimman's evil ways are exposed and he is arrested by the police.

In the end, Manju unites Vasu and Uma by throwing her thali inside the temple hundi and resumes her daily routine.

Cast 

Revathi as Manju
Saranya Ponvannan as Uma
Nizhalgal Ravi as Narasimman
Raja as Vasudevan
Ramesh Aravind as Bhaskar
Visu as Narayana Moorthy
Nagesh as Ramamoorthy
Jai Ganesh as Chandramouli
Annapoorna as Vasudevan's mother
Seetha as Gayathri
Pandu as Gajendran
Kumarimuthu
Jamuna Srinivasan as Meenatchi
Ganga
Suryakanth
Oru Viral Krishna Rao
Idichapuli Selvaraj
Omakuchi Narasimhan

 Telugu cast
Gollapudi Maruti Rao as Minor Babu
Rallapalli as Gajendra
Chitti Babu
K. K. Sarma
Juttu Narasimham as Pullaiah

Soundtrack 
The music was composed by Devendran, with lyrics written by Piraisoodan.

Reception 
K. Vijiyan of New Straits Times wrote, "With Visu's strong dialogues and his customary wisecracks, Meendum Savithri proves to be an entertaining movie, teaching proper values at the same time".

References

External links 

1990s Tamil-language films
1996 drama films
1996 films
Films based on Indian novels
Films directed by Visu
Films scored by Devendran
Films with screenplays by Visu
Indian drama films